This is a list of public art in Neath Port Talbot in south Wales. Neath Port Talbot is a county borough and one of the unitary authority areas of Wales. This list applies only to works of public art on permanent display in an outdoor public space and does not, for example, include artworks in museums.

Bryn

Cadoxton

Clyne

Margam

Neath

Pontardawe

Port Talbot

Resolven

Seven Sisters

Tonna

References

Neath Port Talbot
Neath Port Talbot